Play2Win was a live interactive game show that originally aired from 2 a.m - 3 a.m. Eastern Time on stations owned by Tribune Broadcasting. It moved to the 3 a.m. - 4 a.m. timeslot on February 27, 2007, where it remained until the show ended on March 10, 2007. The one-hour program featured interactive games where the viewers could win cash prizes.

Show Information
The show originally aired on a week-long trial basis as Text2Win on WPIX-TV in New York City from August 14–18, 2006, and returned as a permanent series with its new name on October 17, 2006.

Production format and rules
Play2Win was a game show, hosted by Kansas born, Holland-residing actress Tara Cummins and Los Angeles television hostess Amber Vineyard, where the contestants were home viewers. American residents over eighteen could enter the contest by text messaging a request (for a fee of $1.50 plus cellphone charges), dialing a 1-900 number (also a $1.50 fee), or by using the online form. A person could enter up to ten times per game regardless of entry method. Entries had an equal chance of selection, regardless of the means of entry. If selected, the registrant would be called and become a participant. The on-air contestant had the chance to play the game for cash.

The program was produced by 3Circles Media.

Broadcast history
The show went national on Chicago's Superstation WGN cable network on October 24, 2006 (it never aired on the broadcast Channel 9 in the Chicago area), while also airing on WPIX in the New York City area. It was taken off the air nationally on January 19, 2007 and became exclusive to WPIX in New York City only. On February 13, 2007 WPHL-TV in Philadelphia and WSFL-TV in Miami, Florida began airing the show.

Games
Play2Win featured several timed word minigames. The rewards for the games were cash prizes ranging anywhere from $100 – $1,000 in cash.

The games below were the games most commonly played on the program.

See also
My GamesFever
PlayMania
Midnight Money Madness
Take the Cake

Notes and references

External links
Official website of Play2Win
Tara Cummins' official site
Amber Vineyard's official YouTube Channel

Phone-in quiz shows
2000s American game shows
Nexstar Media Group